This article describes the contract bridge bidding convention.

Meckwell is a method for defending against an opposing strong one notrump (1NT) opening by intervening in the direct and passout seats.  It features the following calls:

The convention is named based on the common sobriquet for the partnership of Jeff Meckstroth and Eric Rodwell, who popularized it.

See also
List of defenses to 1NT

References

External links
 BridgeGuys website

Bridge conventions